Samuel Hodgson (1838 – 29 November 1886) was both a member of the Queensland Legislative Council and the Queensland Legislative Assembly.

Hodgson was born in England in 1838. He arrived in Queensland in 1863 and within a year, he was a partner in a firm trading as Clarke, Hodgson & Co. He entered politics in 1868, winning the seat of West Moreton, holding it till 1870. A year later, Hodgson was appointed to the Queensland Legislative Council but resigned just six months later.

Hodgson left to return to England in 1886 but died at his home Ellenbrooke, on the Isle of Man later that year.

References

Members of the Queensland Legislative Assembly
Members of the Queensland Legislative Council
1838 births
1886 deaths
19th-century Australian politicians